Courtney Harvey Lyder (born June 8, 1966)  is a Trinidadian-American nurse and educator who is recognized internationally for his work in the field of gerontology.
 
Lyder served as dean of the UCLA School of Nursing from 2008 till 2015.

Early life and education 
Courtney Lyder was born in Trinidad and Tobago before immigrating to the United States.

Lyder received his Bachelor of Arts from Beloit College. He attended Rush University nursing school, one of only five males in a class of two hundred,  where he received his Bachelor of Science, Master of Science and Doctor of Naturopathic Medicine. Lyder studied under Luther Christman, the first male dean of a nursing school in the United States, who changed the perceptions and biases people held against males and minorities seeking to enter the field of nursing.

Career 

In August 2008, Lyder was appointed as dean of UCLA School of Nursing, the first male minority head of any such institution in the United States. Lyder's tenure at the school ended on July 1, 2015.

Lyder is internationally recognized for his expertise in gerontology and chronic care issues affecting older adults. He has addressed pressure ulcer prevention, identifying erythema in dark skin, wound healing and quality improvement in skilled nursing facilities, calling attention to the dangers of unnecessary bedsores received by elder patients in hospitals with inattentive staff. According to Lyder and his research team, individuals with chronic conditions such as congestive cardiac failure, pulmonary or cardiovascular disease, diabetes, obesity, and those on steroids who acquire pressure ulcers in hospital were at the highest risk of premature death.

Lyder is a fellow of the American Academy of Nursing and the New York Academy of Medicine. In 2011, he was appointed by United States Secretary of Health and Human Services Kathleen Sebelius to the National Advisory Council for Nursing Research.

Seating upgrades criticism 
Lyder has been cited as one of six deans who leveraged UCLA's lenient medical exemptions in order to upgrade to business class when flying on official college business. Enacted in order to facilitate travel to meetings with wealthy UCLA donors, the travel policy normally required employees to fly coach, except in the following circumstances: when there is a medical need, when coach is unavailable, when using coach would be more expensive or time consuming, or when the trip involves overnight travel without time to rest before work begins.
UCLA paid at least $75,000 for premium flights for Lyder during his tenure. He used a doctor’s note—redacted by UCLA—to justify almost half of these trips. Other times he skirted the restriction because he said he needed extra rest on the plane before a busy schedule of meetings.

Awards and honors 
 National League for Nursing, President's Award (2012)
 Honorary doctorate from Saint Xavier University for contributions to nursing

Eponymous foods 

There are a number of cocktails and culinary dishes named for Lyder (or his dog), due to him being a regular patron of various Los Angeles restaurants:

Selected publications 
 ND, GNP Courtney H. Lyder, Chang Yu, JaeEmerling, MSN, GNP Rupinder Mangat, M.Div., MSN, GNP David Stevenson, MSN(c), RN Ophelia Empleo-Frazier, BS Jim McKay (May 1999).  The Braden Scale for Pressure Ulcer Risk: Evaluating the Predictive Validity in Black and Latino/Hispanic Elders. Applied Nursing Research, Volume 12, Issue 2, Pages 60–68.
 Lyder, C., Preston, J., Grady, J., Scinto, J., Allman, R., Bergstrom, N. & Rodeheaver, G. (2001).  Compliance with Pressure Ulcer Prevention Quality Indicators in Hospitals. Archives of Internal Medicine 161, 1549-1554.
 Courtney H. Lyder (2002). Pressure Ulcer Prevention and Management. Annual Review of Nursing Research
 Lyder, C., Shannon, R., Empleo-Frazier, O., McGee, D. & White, C. (2002). A Comprehensive Program to Prevent Pressure Ulcers: Exploring Cost and Outcomes. Ostomy/Wound Management 48, 52-62.
 Lyder, C. (2003).  Exploring pressure ulcer prevention and management. Journal of the American Medical Association 289, 223-226.
 Lyder, C., Grady, J., Mathur, D., Patrello, M. & Meehan, T. (2004). Preventing pressure ulcers in Connecticut hospitals using the plan-do-study-act model for quality improvement. Joint Commission. Journal of Quality and Safety 30, 205-214.
 Lyder, C. (2007). The Use of Technology for Improved Pressure Ulcer Prevention. Ostomy/Wound Management 53,(4), 14-16.
 Lyder, C. (2006). Effective management of pressure ulcers: A review of proven strategies.  Advance for Nurse Practitioners 14(7), 32-38.
 Courtney H. Lyder ND FAAN, Cheryl Chia‐Hui Chen RN MSN GNP, Lynne S. Schilling RN MN PhD (July 7, 2008).  A Concept Analysis of Malnutrition in the Elderly, JAN Wiley Online Library 
 Lyder, Courtney H. ND, GNP, FAAN; Krasner, Diane L. PhD, RN, CWCN, CWS, BCLNC, MAPWCA, FAAN; Ayello, Elizabeth A. PhD, RN, ACNS-BC, ETN, CWCN, MAPWCA, FAAN (January 2010). Clarification from the American Nurses Association on the Nurse's Role in Pressure Ulcer Staging. Volume 23 - Issue 1 - p 8. Advances in Skin and Wound Care Journal
 Lyder, Courtney H.; Ayello, Elizabeth A. (2008). Pressure Ulcers: A Patient Safety Issue. In: Hughes RG, ed. Patient Safety and Quality: An Evidence-Based Handbook for Nurses. Rockville, MD: Agency for Healthcare Research and Quality; American Nurse Today, July 2011 Vol. 6 No. 7. Retrieved December 17, 2018.
 Lyder, C. &. Ayello, E. (2009). An annual checkup- One year after the implementation of the CMS POA pressure ulcer on admission indicator. Advances in Skin and Wound Care 22, 476-484.
 Courtney H. Lyder ND, Yun Wang PhD, Mark Metersky MD, Maureen Curry MHA, Rebecca Kliman MPH, Nancy R. Verzier MSN, David R. Hunt MD (17 September 2012). Hospital‐Acquired Pressure Ulcers: Results from the National Medicare Patient Safety Monitoring System Study. Journal of the American Geriatrics Society

See also 
  
 Estelle Massey Osborne – pioneering African–American nurse and educator

References

External links 
 Courtney H. Lyder; Elizabeth A. Ayello. Pressure Ulcers: A Patient Safety Issue, Chapter 12. NCBI
 Dean Courtney Lyder Comments on Honor, UCLA Health channel on YouTube
 Pinnacle Lecture: Courtney H. Lyder, on Vimeo

1966 births
21st-century American educators
Beloit College alumni
Rush University alumni
American gerontologists
American nurses
Expatriate academics in the United States
Fellows of the American Academy of Nursing
Male nurses
Nursing researchers
Nursing school deans
Trinidad and Tobago academics
Trinidad and Tobago emigrants to the United States
Trinidad and Tobago nurses
UCLA School of Nursing faculty
Living people
American university and college faculty deans